Anthony Knapp (born 13 October 1936) is an English former football player and manager, who played as a defender in the English football league in the 1960s.

Career
Knapp was born in Newstead, Nottinghamshire. He trained with Nottingham Forest before becoming professional, as a player for Leicester City (1955–61, 86 matches), Southampton (1961–67, 260 matches, 2 goals), Coventry City (1967–68, 11 matches), Los Angeles Wolves (1968) and Tranmere Rovers (1969–71, 36 matches, 1 goal).

His career as a manager started in Poole Town (1971–72, also player) and as an assistant coach to Norwich City. He then had success with the amateurs Iceland national team (1974–77, A, U18, U21) as in their beating the East Germany 2–1 (1975). In Norway he had success with Viking FK (1978–81, winning the double  1979), Fredrikstad FK (1982–83), again Iceland (1984–85), and SK Brann (1986–87, cupfinalist). Since then Knapp has coached several lower division clubs in Rogaland, such as  FK Vidar, Djerv 1919, Sandnes Ulf, Staal Jørpeland (2003), Stavanger IF and Hundvåg FK (2004–05), as well as Lillesand IL (2007–08) in Aust-Agder, before he retired due to illness.

Personal life
As of February 2020, Knapp was residing in Jørpeland in Norway with his wife and children.

Honours
Southampton
Football League Second Division runners-up:  1965–66

References

Tony Knapp, Post War English & Scottish Football League A - Z Player's Transfer Database

Living people
1936 births
People from Newstead, Nottinghamshire
English footballers
Footballers from Nottinghamshire
Association football defenders
English Football League representative players
English Football League players
North American Soccer League (1968–1984) players
Leicester City F.C. players
Southampton F.C. players
Coventry City F.C. players
Los Angeles Wolves players
Tranmere Rovers F.C. players
Poole Town F.C. players
English football managers
Poole Town F.C. managers
Knattspyrnufélag Reykjavíkur managers
Iceland national football team managers
Viking FK managers
Fredrikstad FK managers
SK Brann managers
FK Vidar managers
Sandnes Ulf managers
English expatriate footballers
English expatriate football managers
English expatriate sportspeople in the United States
Expatriate soccer players in the United States
English expatriate sportspeople in Iceland
Expatriate football managers in Iceland
English expatriate sportspeople in Norway
Expatriate football managers in Norway